"You Ought to Be with Me" is a song by Al Green. Released from his album, Call Me, the single spent a week at number one on the Hot Soul Singles chart.  It was also successful on the pop chart, peaking at number three on the Billboard Hot 100 singles chart in late 1972. It sold over one million copies and was certified gold by the RIAA.

Chart positions

References

1972 singles
Al Green songs
Songs written by Willie Mitchell (musician)
Songs written by Al Green
Songs written by Al Jackson Jr.
1972 songs
Hi Records singles